Marcelina Orta Coronado (born 11 August 1968) is a Mexican politician affiliated with the PAN. She currently serves as Deputy of the LXII Legislature of the Mexican Congress representing Tamaulipas.

References

1968 births
Living people
Politicians from Tamaulipas
Women members of the Chamber of Deputies (Mexico)
National Action Party (Mexico) politicians
21st-century Mexican politicians
21st-century Mexican women politicians
Deputies of the LXII Legislature of Mexico
Members of the Chamber of Deputies (Mexico) for Tamaulipas